The Microsoft Research - University of Trento Centre for Computational and Systems Biology (COSBI) is a nonprofit research center in Trentino, Italy. Its first office opened on December 6, 2005 in Trento; the second opened in 2011 in Rovereto. It is a limited liability consortium, half owned by Microsoft Research Cambridge and half by the University of Trento.

History

Origin
COSBI is a joint venture between Microsoft Research and the University of Trento. The founding agreement was signed in Prague on February 2, 2005 by the Minister of Education, University and Research (Minister Letizia Moratti), the Minister of Innovation and Technology (Minister Lucio Stanca), the Province of Trento (Gianluca Salvatori, Councillor of Planning, Research, and Innovation), the University of Trento (Davide Bassi, Rector), the Microsoft Corporation (Bill Gates, president and founder). COSBI was inaugurated on December 7, 2005.

Merging knowledge
COSBI celebrated its fifth anniversary by hosting the conference Merging Knowledge: Trento, Italy (November 30 – December 3, 2010). During the event scientific speakers discussed the relevance of computer science to the study of systems biology by exploring the main fields of computational and systems biology, as well as nutrigenomics, which merges personalized medicine with personalized diet. Among the lecturers: Tony Hoare, principal researcher at Microsoft Research; Leroy Hood, president of the Institute for Systems Biology; James Kaput, a director within the U.S. Food and Drug Administration; and Jeannette Wing, President’s Professor of Computer Science and department head of the School of Computer Science at Carnegie Mellon University.

Research
COSBI is a multi-disciplinary group of researchers, software developers and analysts  studying Algorithmic Systems Biology through research, projects and solutions. It develops and applies programming language technologies to model, simulate and analyze complex biological systems.

See also
 Systems Biology
 List of systems sciences organizations

Notes

External links 

 

Microsoft Research
Computer science research organizations
Research and development organizations
Systems science institutes
Systems biology